Saint Andrew's Society refers to one of many independent organizations celebrating Scottish heritage which can be found all over the world.

Some Saint Andrew's Societies limit membership to people born in Scotland or their descendants. Some still only accept male members. They are generally not-for-profit or charitable organizations. These societies organize social activities for their members as well as promoting the preservation of Scottish heritage.

List of St. Andrew's Societies 

 St. Andrew's Society of the Adirondacks
 St. Andrew's Society of Aiken
 St. Andrew's Society of Albany
 St. Andrew's Society of Athens
 St. Andrew's Society of Atlanta
 St. Andrew's Society of Baltimore
 Bangkok St Andrew's Society
 St. Andrew-Caledonian Society of Calgary
 St. Andrew's Society of Charleston, South Carolina
 St. Andrew's Society of Colorado
 St. Andrew's Society of Connecticut
 St. Andrew’s Society of Detroit
 St. Andrew's Society of the East Bay, Oakland, California
 St. Andrew's Society of Central Florida
 St Andrew's Society of Glasgow
 St. Andrew's Society of Hong Kong
 Illinois Saint Andrew's Society
 St. Andrew's Society of Central Illinois
 St. Andrew's Society of the Inland Northwest
 St. Andrew's Society of Jacksonville
 Kansas City Saint Andrew Society
 St. Andrew's Society of Los Angeles
 St. Andrew's Society of Madison, Wisconsin
 St. Andrew's Society of Maine
 Manila St. Andrew's Society
 St. Andrew's Society of Mexico
 St. Andrew's Society of the Middle South, Alabama
 St. Andrew's Society of the City of Milwaukee, Wisconsin
 St. Andrew's Society of Low Country, South Carolina
 St. Andrew's Society of Mid-Maryland
 St. Andrew's Society of the Middle South
 St. Andrew's Society of Modesto
 St. Andrew's Society of Montreal
 St. Andrew's Society of Naples, Florida
 St. Andrew Scottish Society of New Mexico
 Saint Andrew's Society of the State of New York
 St. Andrew's Society of Oregon
 St. Andrew's Society of Panama
 St. Andrew's Society of Philadelphia
 St. Andrew's Society of Pittsburgh
 St. Andrew's Society of Pictou County
 St. Andrew's Society of Rhode Island
 St. Andrew's Society of San Francisco
 St. Andrew's Society of Singapore
 St. Andrew Society of São Paulo
 St. Andrew Society of Sarasota, Florida
 St. Andrew's Society of Tallahassee, Florida
 St. Andrew's Society of Tampa Bay, Florida
 St. Andrew's Society of Toronto
 St. Andrew's Society of Vermont
 St. Andrew's Society of Washington, D.C.
 St. Andrew's Society of Winnipeg

References

External links 
 
A collection of materials donated by the St. Andrew's Society of Washington D. C. is housed at the Special Collections Research Center at the George Mason University Libraries.

Scottish diaspora